Nogoonnuur (green lake) is a sum (district) of Bayan-Ölgii Province in western Mongolia. It is primarily inhabited by ethnic Kazakhs. As of 2014 it had a population of 6003 people.

Part of the potentially valuable Asgat Ag-Sb deposit is within Nogoonnuur where the Asgat mine is situated on the border with Russia.

References

Populated places in Mongolia
Districts of Bayan-Ölgii Province